The 1931 Prince Edward Island general election was held on 6 August 1931 in the Canadian Province of Prince Edward Island. The governing Liberals of Premier Walter Lea were defeated by the Conservatives led by James D. Stewart.

Party Standings

Members Elected

The Legislature of Prince Edward Island had two levels of membership from 1893 to 1996 - Assemblymen and Councillors. This was a holdover from when the Island had a bicameral legislature, the General Assembly and the Legislative Council.

In 1893, the Legislative Council was abolished and had its membership merged with the Assembly, though the two titles remained separate and were elected by different electoral franchises. Assembleymen were elected by all eligible voters of within a district, while Councillors were only elected by landowners within a district.

Kings

Queens

Prince

Sources

Further reading
 

1931 elections in Canada
Elections in Prince Edward Island
1931 in Prince Edward Island
August 1931 events